Spilosoma jordani is a moth in the family Erebidae. It was described by Hubert Robert Debauche in 1938. It is found in the Central African Republic.

References

Endemic fauna of the Central African Republic
Moths described in 1938
jordani